Barbara Island may refer to

 Barbara Island (Antarctica), part of the Debenham Islands in Antarctica
 Barbara Island (Aleutian Islands), part of the Andreanof Islands in the Aleutian Islands
 Barbara Island (Ontario) in Ontario, Canada